The 28th Annual South African Music Awards was the 28th ceremony of the South African Music Awards. The ceremony was broadcast on SABC 1 hosted by Lawrence Maleka and Nandi Madida on August 28, 2022.

Nominees were announced on June 7, 2022. Zakes Bantwini lead the nominations with seven each, ahead of Msaki with 5 nominations.

Background 
The 28th South African Music Awards partnered with TikTok for the first time to promote the ceremony.

Three categories; Record of the Year, Music Video of the Year, SAMPRA Artist of the Year, were announced on June 3, 2022.

Full list nominees were announced on June 7, 2022.

Nominees of the last category sponsored by TikTok was announced on August 14, 2022.

The first ceremony was held at City Superbowl, Rustenburg on 27 August was broadcast live on YouTube and TikTok, hosted by Mpho Popps and Robot Boii.

Winners and nominees 
Winners are listed first in bold.

Special Awards 
Below the list are the recipients of achievement awards announced on  August 2, 2022.

International Achievement 
 Black Coffee for his international debut to the world and his astonishing Grammy win.

Lifetime Achievement 
 McCoy Mrubata
 Joe Nina
 Jimmy Dludlu

Chairmans Award 
 Yvonne Chaka Chaka

SAMRO Highest Radio Airplay Composers Award 
 "Osama" - Zakes Bantwini and Kasango

References

2022 music awards
South African Music Awards